Cathartocryptus obscurus is a species of beetles in the family Silvanidae, the only species in the genus Cathartocryptus.

References

Silvanidae genera
Monotypic Cucujoidea genera